Frank Noel Williams (born 12 December 1964) is a Sierra Leonean former cyclist. He competed in the road race at the 1988 Summer Olympics.

References

External links
 

1964 births
Living people
Sierra Leonean male cyclists
Olympic cyclists of Sierra Leone
Cyclists at the 1988 Summer Olympics
Place of birth missing (living people)